Lake Klooga is a lake in Klooga, northern Estonia.

See also
List of lakes of Estonia

Klooga
Lääne-Harju Parish
Klooga